Felicity Wardlaw (born 14 December 1977) is a female road cyclist from Australia. She became national time trial champion in 2014.

References

External links
 profile at Procyclingstats.com

1977 births
Australian female cyclists
Living people
Place of birth missing (living people)